Hugh I, Count of Clermont-en-Beauvaisis (1030–1101), son of Renaud I of Clermont (1010–1088), son-in-law of Baldwin II of Clermont, the second known Count of Clermont.  Hugh was an early founder of the House of Clermont.

Hugh married Marguerite de Ramerupt, daughter of Hilduin IV, Count of Montdidier, and his wife Alice de Roucy.  Hugh and Marguerite had eight children:
 Renaud II, Count of Clermont-en-Beauvaisis
 Gui, who died imprisoned in Rouen in 1119
 Hugues (d. after 1099)
 Ermentrude, married to Hugh d'Avranches, 1st Earl of Chester; many of their offspring and other relatives died in the White Ship disaster of 1120.
 Adelise (Alix), married to Gilbert Fitz Richard, Lord of Clare, whose issue were prominent nobles in England
 Marguerite, married to Gilbert de Gerberoy
 Richilde, married to Dreux II, Sire de Mello
 Emme (Béatrice), Dame de Luzarches, married to Mathieu I, Count of Beaumont-sur-Oise.

Upon his death, Hugh was succeeded as Count of Clermont-en-Beauvaisis by his son Renaud.

Sources 

Prime, Temple, Note on the County of Clermont, Notes Relative to Certain Matters Connected with French History, De Vinne Press, New York, 1903 (available on Google Books)

References 

 
Clermont-en-Beauvaisis